Scaglieri is a village in Tuscany, central Italy, administratively a frazione of the comune of Portoferraio, province of Livorno. At the time of the 2011 census its population was 80.

Scaglieri is located on the Elba Island and 7 km west from Portoferraio. The frazione includes the three hamlets of Scaglieri, Forno and Biodola.

Bibliography

External links 
 

Frazioni of Portoferraio